Antoni Nieroba (born 17 January 1939 in Chorzów) is a former Polish football player and manager. He played 17 times for Poland.

References

Sources
 
 Profile at Ruch Chorzów official website

1939 births
Living people
Polish footballers
Poland international footballers
Ruch Chorzów players
LB Châteauroux players
Expatriate footballers in France
Ligue 2 players
Polish expatriate footballers
Polish football managers
LB Châteauroux managers
Sportspeople from Chorzów
Association football midfielders